Porky and Gabby is a 1937 Warner Bros. Looney Tunes cartoon short directed by Ub Iwerks, the co-creator of Mickey Mouse. The short was released on May 15, 1937, and stars Porky Pig along with the first appearance of Gabby Goat.

References

External links
 
 

1937 short films
American black-and-white films
Films directed by Ub Iwerks
Looney Tunes shorts
Warner Bros. Cartoons animated short films
Porky Pig films
1937 animated films
Animated films about animals
Films about pigs
Films scored by Carl Stalling
1930s English-language films
American animated short films
1930s Warner Bros. animated short films